Muhammad Yusuf Khan Hazara known as Sulat al-Sultanah Hazara; was a politician and the first Sunni and Hazara representative member in the Iran parliament for National Consultative Assembly and he is the only sunni Iranian who has represented Mashhad in the history of Iran's legislatures.

Relying on the historical records of the Hazaras and exploiting the favorable context that the Pahlavi regime's actions had left, Sulat al-Sultanah was able to raise not only the nomads of the east, north and west of Khorasan but also many other strata of the people and rule over a large part of Khorasan in a short period from the winter of 1941.

Early life and story 
Sulat al-Sultanah Hazara was born on 1891 in Taybad, Iran. In 1943, he was assassinated by gunfire in a mission in Taybad, Iran. He was from a Sunni Hazara of Iran which most of Hazara reside in Afghanistan. Before the separation of Afghanistan from Iran according to the Treaty of Paris in 1857 during the reign of Naser al-Din Shah, Greater Khorasan covered a part of the west of this land and various tribes and peoples lived in it. One of these tribes was the Hazaras. This tribe, who settled on both sides of the border after drawing the border line between Iran and Afghanistan, has played many roles in the contemporary history of Khorasan province and especially Mashhad. The leadership of this tribe at the end of the Qajar period and also the Pahlavi period was with Sulat al-Sultanah Hazara.

Khorasan Revolt 
Reza Shah summoned Sulat al-Sultanah from Mashhad and imprisoned him in Tehran following a policy of settlement and repression of nomads to be comfortable with Hazaras. After about two years, in 1935, he was deported to Fars with his family and was given land in Yazd and Firuzabad, instead of Khorasan properties. Despite the difficult conditions, Hazaras had extensive construction and agricultural efforts in Fars, which also produced significant results. However, following the events of September 1941 and the return of the Qashqai khans to Fars, who were the main owners of properties assigned to the Hazaras and the cessation of the proceeds of these properties, the situation changed.

He returned to Tehran after the Allies occupied Iran and Reza Shah fled the country. After his efforts to reclaim properties in Tehran did not side and even received death threats, he went to Khorasan and communicated with many heads of local tribes and readers in Mashhad and asked them for help in gaining lost power. In this way, with the help of his brother, "Mantesur al-Mulk", he started a rebellion that was the starting point in the border town of Taybad.

The Sulat al-Sultanah rebellion began in January 1942. His forces were sent from Taybad to Mashhad, and later the rebel forces occupied Bakharz and Fariman and were determined to capture the city of Mashhad. This was while Sulat al-Sultanah was still in Mashhad and led the rebellion from the city. He stated Mashhad after his forces seized the city of Fariman. In part, it stated:

See also 
 List of Hazara people

References

External links 
 داستان ناتمام صولت السلطنه هزاره خانِ بزرگ تايباد و باخرز

1891 births
1943 deaths
Hazara people
Hazara politicians
Iranian Sunni Muslims
People from Mashhad
19th-century Iranian people
20th-century Iranian people